Phillip Barry Stack (born 1977) is an Australian jazz and rock musician. He is the founding mainstay bass guitarist of the pop rock band Thirsty Merc, which formed in 2002; the regular double bassist for jazz musician James Morrison; and he is the leader of the jazz and rock ensemble called Phil Stack Trio.

Biography 

Born in 1977, Stack grew up with his three older sisters in the New South Wales city of Dubbo. Stack is an accomplished jazz and rock musician within Australia. He is also a regular performer, playing double bass with Australian jazz music icon James Morrison. Stack studied at the Sydney Conservatorium of Music in his earlier years and is now a regular feature at major music festivals in the rock and jazz genre.

In November 2008, Stack was awarded first place in the National Jazz Awards held at the Melbourne Jazz Festival. After the initial 10 finalists were reduced to 3, Phil beat Ben Waples (Sydney) and Sam Anning (Melbourne) in the final.

References

Australian bass guitarists
Living people
Thirsty Merc members
Sydney Conservatorium of Music alumni
1977 births
21st-century bass guitarists